"Santa Clara High School" may refer to:

 Santa Clara High School (Oxnard, California)
 Santa Clara High School (Santa Clara, California)
 Santa Clara High School (La Paz, Honduras) or Intituto Santa Clara